Madampattavur is a village in the Pattukkottai taluk of Thanjavur district, [[Tamil Nadu]

Demographics 

As per the 2001 census, Madampattavur had a total population of 608 with 289 males and 319 females. The sex ratio was 1104. The literacy rate was 54.86.

References 

 

Villages in Thanjavur district